Leopard lily is a common name for several plants and may refer to:
 Dieffenbachia, a genus containing species cultivated as ornamental houseplants
 Ledebouria socialis, a species native to South Africa
 Lilium catesbaei, a lily species native to southeastern North America
 Lilium pardalinum, a lily species native to western North America
 Iris domestica, a cultivated species also known as Belamcanda chinensis

See also 
 Leopard plant
 Tiger lily (disambiguation)